George Makeston  was an Irish dean in the first half of the 16th century.

A Scotsman,  he was Dean of Armagh from 1622 until his death at Legacorry in 1635.

References

Irish Anglicans
1635 deaths
Scottish people